Power transition theory is a theory about the nature of war, in relation to the power in international relations. The theory was first published in 1958 by its creator, A.F.K. Organski, in his textbook, World Politics (1958).

Overview
According to Organski:
An even distribution of political, economic, and military capabilities between contending groups of states is likely to increase the probability of war; peace is preserved best when there is an imbalance of national capabilities between disadvantaged and advantaged nations; the aggressor will come from a small group of dissatisfied strong countries; and it is the weaker, rather than the stronger power that is most likely to be the aggressor.

Hierarchy
While Organski's hierarchy initially referred only to the entire international system, Douglas Lemke later expanded the hierarchy model to include regional hierarchies, arguing that each region contains its own dominant, great, and small powers. Thus regional hierarchies exist embedded into the larger international hierarchy.

Historical application

The theory leads to the long cycle theory of war and seeks to explain trends between warring states in the past 500 years. The general trend is that a nation achieves hegemonic power and then is challenged by a great power. This leads to a war which, in the past, has created a transition between the two powers. Eugene R. Wittkopf explores past wars and their relation to Power Transition theory in his book World Politics: Trend and Transformation. He explains this using George Modelski's Seapower Concentration Index.

At 1518, Portugal assumed a hegemonic position in world politics. However, as the Netherlands (which was experiencing the Dutch Golden Age) rose in power, a series of struggles led to the destruction of Portugal's power and a transition to Dutch hegemony. Dutch hegemony was brought into question again in 1688 with the Wars of Louis XIV, which resulted in what is referred to as the "Britain I Cycle", the Napoleonic Wars interrupted this cycle and questioned the hegemony Britain possessed. However, Britain's victory resulted in maintenance of power and the "Britain II Cycle". This cycle ended with the World Wars and Wittkopf shows the period of 1914–1945 as one of particular turbulence in which no power maintained hegemony, even after the Treaty of Versailles. After the second World War, a drastic increase in seapower concentration by the United States was experienced and it – along with the Soviet Union – became the world's first superpowers.

In general, hegemonic periods last approximately 60 to 90 years and conflicts which result in a period stabilization of power distribution last approximately 20 years. This can be explained through war-weariness and the tendency (although this was broken in the first half of the 20th century) for nations not to engage themselves in another conflict after being involved in a power transition.

Power transitions play an important role in applications of the bargaining model of war where wars are more likely to break out and be severe in situations of uncertainty and commitment problems. During power transitions, it is harder for actors to credibly commit to abide by any agreement, thus creating major commitment problems.

See also
 Thucydides trap

References

External links
 Hegemonic Zones of Influence by Michael Schreiber, The Wolfram Demonstrations Project.

International relations terminology
International relations theory